On 3 June 1989, at 22:20 IRST, Grand Ayatollah Ruhollah Khomeini, leader of the Iranian Revolution and the first Supreme Leader and founder of the Islamic Republic of Iran, died in Jamaran, Greater Tehran aged 89 after spending eleven days at a private hospital, near his residency, after suffering five heart attacks in ten days. Sources put his age at 89, and list the cause of death as bleeding in the digestive system. As a mark of respect, Iran's government ordered all schools to be closed on Sunday and declared 40 days of mourning and said schools would be closed for five days. Pakistan declared ten days of national mourning, Syria announced seven days of mourning, Afghanistan, Lebanon and India announced three days of mourning.

Khomeini was given a state funeral and buried at the Behesht-e Zahra (The Paradise of Zahra) cemetery in south Tehran. It was estimated that around 10 million people participated in his funeral, one-sixth of the population of Iran, which is the largest proportion of a population ever to attend a funeral procession and also one of the largest gatherings in human history.

Funeral service

The first funeral 
On 5 June, the coffin with Khomeini's body was transferred to the Musalla, a vacant lot in north Tehran. The body was displayed there on a high podium made out of steel shipping containers, in an air-conditioned glass case, wrapped in a white shroud. It stayed there until the next day allowing hundreds of thousands of mourners to see the body. On 6 June, the body was brought down and the coffin opened for Grand Ayatollah Mohammad-Reza Golpaygani to lead the Salat al-Janazah (funeral prayer), which lasted for 20 minutes. Afterwards, since the crowds of mourners had swelled overnight to several millions, it was impossible to deliver the body to the cemetery through Tehran to the southern part of the city in a procession. Eventually, the body was transferred to an Army Aviation Bell 214A/C helicopter and brought by air to the cemetery.  A stampede due to the massive crowd killed eight people at the funeral procession.

At the cemetery, the crowd surged past the makeshift barriers and the authorities lost control of the events. According to journalist John Kifner of The New York Times:

The second funeral 
The body was taken back to north Tehran to go through the ritual of preparation a second time. To thin the crowd, it was announced on television and radio that the funeral had been postponed. Five hours later, the body was returned to the cemetery and this time the guards were better prepared. The body was brought out of a helicopter, sealed in a metal box resembling an airline shipping container. Once again, the crowd broke through the cordon, but by weight of numbers the guards managed to push their way through to the grave. There, according to reporters for Time magazine:

In 1992, the construction of the Mausoleum of Ruhollah Khomeini on the burial site was completed.

See also 
 Funeral of Qasem Soleimani
 Death and state funeral of Akbar Hashemi Rafsanjani
 1989 Iranian Supreme Leader election

References 

Ruhollah Khomeini
Khomeini
Khomeini
June 1989 events in Iran
1989 in Iran
Khomeini